The National Party (SN) was a Polish nationalist political party formed on 7 October 1928 after the transformation of Popular National Union. It gathered together most of the political forces of Poland's National Democracy right-wing political camp. SN was one of the main opponents of the Sanacja government. Shortly before World War II the party had 200,000 members, being the largest opposition party of that time.

In the 1930s the two main factions competed within the party, the "old generation" and "young generation", divided by the age and political programmes. The old generation supported the parliamentary means of political competition, while the activist young generation advocated the extra-parliamentary means of political struggle. In 1935 the young activists took over the leadership of the party. In 1934 a significant part of the young faction split off from the SN, forming the National-Radical Camp. During World War II, many SN activists joined the National Armed Forces and National Military Organization resistance organizations.

Policies
The main goal of the party was the construction of a Catholic Polish State, through combining the principles of Catholicism and Nationalism. The party advocated a hierarchical organisation of society and the transformation of the political system by increasing the role of the Polish National elite within the country. The SN organised numerous rallies and demonstrations against the policies of the Sanacja government.

It had the most influential political centres in Greater Poland, Pomerania, Warsaw, Wilno and Lwów. Prominent leaders of the old generation included Stanisław Stroński, Marian Seyda, Roman Rybarski, Stanisław Głąbiński, Witold Staniszkis, Wacław Komarnicki, Jan Zamorski, Jan Załuska and Stanisław Rymar. The young generation was represented by Tadeusz Bielecki, Jędrzej Giertych, Kazimierz Kowalski, Adam Doboszyński, Karol Stojanowski, Tadeusz Dworak, Karol Frycz, Witold Nowosad and Stefan Sacha.

After World War II
During the period of the Polish People's Republic the organization was outlawed in Poland but continued in the Polish emigration with a major centre in London. It was re-established in Warsaw in 1989 by Jan Ostoj Matłachowski, Leon Mirecki, Maciej Giertych, Boguslaw Jeznach, Bogusław Rybicki, and others. The new SN was officially registered on 21 August 1990 in sovereign Poland after the fall of communism in 1989. Most of its members eventually entered the League of Polish Families (LPR) and dissolved the National Party in 2001.

Electoral results

Sejm

References

1928 establishments in Poland
1947 disestablishments in Poland
Catholic political parties
Conservative parties in Poland
Defunct political parties in Poland
National conservative parties
National Democracy
Nationalist parties in Poland
Polish nationalist parties
Political parties disestablished in 1947
Political parties established in 1928